Teeke is a village in Kara-Suu District, Osh Region of Kyrgyzstan. Its population was 903 in 2021.

References

Populated places in Osh Region